Cermis (Alpe Cermis in italian) is a mountain of the Lagorai group in eastern Trentino, Italy in the comune of Cavalese.

Part of the Val di Fiemme-Obereggen, it is famous for its ski slopes.

It was the scene of major disasters involving the aerial tramway style cable car system on the mountain: the Cavalese cable car disaster in 1976, and the Cavalese cable car massacre in 1998; the latter occurred when a U.S. military plane, while flying too low against regulations, cut a cable supporting a gondola of an aerial tramway, killing 20 people. The two cable car runs of the system involved in those incidents have since been replaced by three consecutive multi-cabin gondola lifts. The arrival site of the first chair lift, from where the second starts, may be also reached by road.

Sports

Tour de Ski
The Alpe Cermis is climbed annually as the final stage in the Tour de Ski. The Final Climb stage up the alpine skiing course has been the final stage every year since the first Tour de Ski in 2006–07. The stage held as a mass start in 2020.

Final Climb stage winners

References

External links
Official website 

Mountains of the Alps
Mountains of Trentino